Hsu Tain-tsair (born 23 January 1953) is a Taiwanese politician who served as the mayor of Tainan City from 2001 to 2010. Born in Tainan County (now part of Tainan City), Hsu got his PhD candidacy in economics in the United States, where he started participating in the independence movement of Taiwan. He was placed on the blacklist of Kuomintang and was not allowed to return to Taiwan until 1990.

When Hsu returned to Taiwan, he joined the Democratic Progressive Party (DPP). Having been elected legislator three times, Hsu is considered a privy councilor to the DPP in the field of economics. He was nominated to run for the mayor of Tainan and was elected in 2001. During his terms as mayor, Hsu worked on public projects and encouraged tourism. For example, a police unit was established to facilitate tourists in 2007, and he also improved the environment of the city.

In 2009, Hsu worked with the Tainan County government to push for a merger that would form a special municipality. The merger was set to take effect in December 2010, giving Hsu one additional year in his mayoral term. During the DPP primary election for the nomination of a new Tainan mayor in May, he lost to William Lai by 12% of the votes. After Lai elected mayor, Hsu later ran for Lai's seat as a member of Legislative Yuan and was finally elected.

Early years
After graduating from Duba Elementary School in Tainan County, Hsu attended Tsengwen Junior High School (曾文中學; now the Madou Junior High School), where he was a classmate of former President of the Republic of China (Taiwan) Chen Shui-bian for four years. He then attended the Cheng Kung Senior High School. In 1976, Hsu got his Master of Economics degree from the Chinese Culture University and started teaching banking the next year at the same school. Hsu, however, is confident about Tainan being chosen as the location for the new branch because of the transport convenience and academic resources of the region.

Environment
Under his term, the environment of the city greatly improved. Hsu started a program of having the city's garbage trucks ring out brief English lessons in 2002. He promoted the use of eco-friendly chopsticks by requiring government officials and teachers to use their own reusable chopsticks when dining, expressing that the goal of the campaign is to reduce the use of disposable chopsticks by 100,000 pairs per day.

During his second term in office, Tainan City became the first Taiwanese city to enter the Alliance for Healthy Cities of the World Health Organization. In addition, Tainan also became the first Taiwanese city to enter the Global Cities Dialogue. Hsu also believes that Tainan should become a city of international tourism and culture, and he is working towards that purpose. In September 2007, he spoke to the 2007 Asia-Pacific Cities Summit participants and stated that Tainan is blessed with natural, historical, cultural, and humanistic characteristics and that Tainan also possesses great conditions for high-tech, trade, and investment development.

Hsu worked to make Tainan a smoke-free environment. After the successful ban of smoking in public areas such as shopping centers, he pushed through the ban of smoking in historical sites. The Chihkan Tower became the first smoke-free historical site in Taiwan after the passing of the regulation in October 2007. Other historical sites covered by the regulation include Tainan Confucian Temple, Fort Zeelandia, and Eternal Golden Castle.

In January 2008, the government of Tainan started an operation to clean up dioxin-contaminated soil around the site of a defunct factory of Taiwan Alkali Industrial Corp (台鹼公司). The Hsu administration was the first to take action since 1982 when the government became aware of the mercury concentrations.

Law enforcement
Due to an accidental killing of a teenage girl, while trying to shoot a psychotic suspect, the Tainan City Police Bureau made a decision to develop a special kind of baton in 2006. When dealing with suspects without firearms, the police officers are expected to use the baton first in order to reduce accidents. To commemorate the girl who died, mayor Hsu named the baton after her.

In September 2007, the Tourism Mounted Police Unit of Tainan was established to attract tourists. The members of the unit wear green uniforms and ride bicycles around the city on the weekends. They facilitate tourists and at the same time try to reduce crime rate.

Criticism
After the DPP nominated Hsu as the 2001 Tainan mayoral race candidate, protests led by supporters of then-incumbent mayor George Chang, who is also a member of the DPP, arose. The protesters called Hsu a betrayer of the party as he left the party in 1995. They showed their disapproval of the party's choice by burning their party membership cards.

The prevention of dengue fever in Taiwan was always most successful in Tainan City. In 2007, however, outbreaks in the city were almost unstoppable. The fever outbreaks originally occurred only in Annan District, where the first case was reported in June. The health department failed to control the spread of the fever, and all six districts ended up having confirmed cases. There was also an outbreak in an old soldiers' home. On August 22, Mayor Hsu apologized for the disastrous outbreak of dengue fever; he announced that the health department would be reorganized and new officials would be appointed in six months.

Mayoral scandals
While then-mayor of Taipei Ma Ying-jeou was indicted for alleged misuse of "special allowance fund," prosecutors dropped Hsu Tain-tsair's case in March 2007. However, on April 10, 2007, Hsu was indicted by prosecutors for his alleged involvement in a construction scandal and violations of the Government Procurement Act. The scandal was broken by the Tainan City councillor Hsieh Long-chieh (謝龍介) in May 2006 during a council meeting.

In April 2007, Hsu was indicted by the Tainan prosecutors. In their statement of charges, the prosecutors accused Hsu of money grafting in an underground city construction project. According to Hsu, the prosecutors heavily used the testimonies of people who were convicted of crime. In August 2009, Hsu was found not guilty by the Tainan District Court.

Electoral history

References

External links

 Taiwan Tribune 
 North America Taiwanese Professors' Association

1951 births
Cheng Kung Senior High School alumni
Living people
Mayors of Tainan
Democratic Progressive Party Members of the Legislative Yuan
Tainan Members of the Legislative Yuan
Columbia University alumni
Rutgers University alumni
Taiwan independence activists
The New School alumni
Members of the 2nd Legislative Yuan
Members of the 3rd Legislative Yuan
Members of the 4th Legislative Yuan
Members of the 8th Legislative Yuan